FK Bežanija is a football club based in Bežanija, Belgrade, Serbia. They compete in the Belgrade Inter-Municipal League, the sixth tier of the national league system.

History
Founded in 1921, the club changed its name several times in its early stages, being known as Soko, BSK and finally HŠK (during the Axis occupation of Yugoslavia). They adopted the new name Jedinstvo following the end of World War II in 1946, becoming a member of the Novi Sad Football Association. After competing in the Syrmia League for six years, the club joined the Belgrade Football Association in 1952. They would change their name to Bežanija ahead of the 1955–56 season.

Following the breakup of Yugoslavia, the club won the Serbian League Belgrade in 2000 and took promotion to the Second League of FR Yugoslavia, reaching the second tier for the first time ever. They competed in Group North for two seasons, finishing bottom of the table in 2002. However, the club instantly won the Serbian League Belgrade to earn promotion back to the second tier in 2003.

In the 2005–06 campaign, the club finished as Serbian First League champions and earned promotion to the newly formed Serbian SuperLiga. They became the biggest surprise of the competition's inaugural 2006–07 season (despite playing their home games at Železnik), placing fourth and securing a spot in the 2007–08 UEFA Cup. However, the club was eliminated in the first qualifying round by Albanian side Besa Kavajë on the away goals rule (2–2 on aggregate), without losing a game.

After suffering relegation in the 2007–08 Serbian SuperLiga, the club went on to spend 11 consecutive seasons in the Serbian First League, finishing in fourth place on three occasions during this time. They were forced to withdraw from the league due to financial difficulties following the conclusion of the 2018–19 season, finding themselves in the Belgrade Inter-Municipal League, the sixth tier of Serbian football. In June 2021, the club marked its 100th anniversary.

Honours
Serbian First League (Tier 2)
 2005–06
Serbian League Belgrade (Tier 3)
 1999–2000, 2002–03

Seasons

European record

Notable players
This is a list of players who have played at full international level.

  Samir Memišević
  Ibrahim Somé Salombo
  Viktor Kelm
  Darko Božović
  Đorđije Ćetković
  Dejan Damjanović
  Milan Purović
  Marko Simić
  Hong Yong-jo
  Mario Đurovski
  Nikola Gligorov
  Bojan Markoski
  Perica Stančeski
  Milan Biševac
  Aleksandar Busnić
  Nenad Lukić
  Filip Manojlović
  Milovan Milović
  Antonio Rukavina
  Bojan Šaranov
  Lazar Tufegdžić
  Ivan Dudić
  Miloš Kolaković

For a list of all FK Bežanija players with a Wikipedia article, see :Category:FK Bežanija players.

Managerial history

References

External links
 
 Club page at Srbijasport

1921 establishments in Serbia
Association football clubs established in 1921
Football clubs in Serbia
Football clubs in Belgrade
New Belgrade